The February 1917 Dublin University by-election was held on 5 February 1917.  The by-election was held due to the incumbent Irish Unionist MP, James Campbell, becoming Lord Chief Justice of Ireland.  It was won by the Irish Unionist candidate Arthur Warren Samuels.

References

1917 elections in Ireland
1917 elections in the United Kingdom
By-elections to the Parliament of the United Kingdom in Dublin University